Briton Ferry East railway station served the town of Briton Ferry, in the historical county of Glamorganshire, Wales, from 1895 to 1935 on the Rhondda and Swansea Bay Railway.

History 
The station was opened as Briton Ferry on 14 March 1895 by the Rhondda and Swansea Bay Railway. It closed on 16 September 1935 when it was replaced by the newer Briton Ferry station.

References 

Disused railway stations in Neath Port Talbot
Railway stations in Great Britain opened in 1895
Railway stations in Great Britain closed in 1935
1895 establishments in Wales
1935 disestablishments in Wales